Oligodon pseudotaeniatus, commonly known as the false striped kukri snake, is a species of colubrid snake. It is endemic to Thailand and known from the Nakhon Ratchasima Province, Saraburi Province, and Bangkok. The type series was collected by Malcolm Arthur Smith. The specific name pseudotaeniatus refers to its similarity to Oligodon taeniatus, with whom it was confused prior to its species description in 2008.

Description
Oligodon pseudotaeniatus are small snakes. The only female had  SVL and tail length, respectively.

This species is morphologically similar to Oligodon taeniatus, differing from the latter by the combination of 17 dorsal scale rows at its midbody, eight supralabials, the absence of dorsal and tail blotches, and the presence of a single vertebral black stripe but no dorsolateral stripes.

Habitat and conservation
This terrestrial and diurnal species occurs in deciduous dipterocarp forests and agricultural land (e.g., cassava plots).

There seem not to be major threats to this species as it tolerates human-modified habitats; however, it has probably been extirpated from Bangkok. It is presumed to be safe in parts of its range that include the Sakaerat Biosphere Reserve on the western edge of the Khorat Plateau.

References

Further reading
Neang, Thy, L. Lee Grismer, and Jennifer C. Daltry. "A new species of kukri snake (Colubridae: Oligodon Fitzinger, 1826) from the Phnom Samkos Wildlife Sanctuary, Cardamom Mountains, southwest Cambodia." Zootaxa 3388 (2012): 41-55.
Vassilieva, Anna B., et al. "A new species of Kukri Snake (Oligodon Fitzinger, 1826; Squamata: Colubridae) from the Cat Tien National Park, southern Vietnam." Zootaxa 3702.3 (2013): 233-246.

External links

Reptile Database

pseudotaeniatus
Snakes of Southeast Asia
Endemic fauna of Thailand
Reptiles of Thailand
Reptiles described in 2008